The  is a national expressway in the Tōhoku region of Japan. The  expressway begins at an interchange with the Tōhoku Expressway in Kitakami, Iwate from where it proceeds northwest towards the capital of Akita Prefecture, Akita. From there, it travels northeast back to another interchange along the Tōhoku Expressway in the town of Kosaka. It is jointly owned and operated by East Nippon Expressway Company and the Ministry of Land, Infrastructure, Transport and Tourism (MLIT). The Akita Expressway is numbered E7 between Kosaka and Kitakami Junctions and E46 between Kitakami and Kawabe Junctions under the MLIT's "2016 Proposal for Realization of Expressway Numbering."

Route description

The expressway begins at a junction with the Tōhoku Expressway in Iwate Prefecture and crosses into Akita Prefecture to the west. The route intersects the Yuzawa-Yokote Road in Yokote and the Nihonkai-Tōhoku Expressway in the Akita city area. From this junction, the route follows a northerly course parallel to the Sea of Japan to National Route 7 in Noshiro where the expressway meets a gap in its routing. The expressway resumes its course, heading northeast towards the Tōhoku Expressway near Odate–Noshiro Airport in Kitaakita. The Akita Expressway ends at a junction with the Tōhoku Expressway in the town of Kosaka.

The sections between Hachiryū and Futatsui-Shirakami interchanges and Kanisawa Interchange and Kosaka Junction are toll-free; all other sections assess tolls based on distance traveled in the same manner as most other national expressways.

The expressway was the first highway of its kind to employ a snow-melting system that stores heat in the expressway's embankments during the summer. The system is in place in Daisen outside of the Kyowa Tunnel. The heat is then released during heavy snowfall events to clear snow off the expressway.

Official designations
The entire route is signed as the Akita Expressway for consistency purposes, however two separate sections of the route are officially designated as the Akita Sotokanjō Expressway and Kotooka Noshiro Road (both bypasses of National Route 7).

Kitakami JCT - Akita-kita IC : Tōhoku Ōdan Expressway Kamaishi Akita Route
Akita-kita IC - Shōwa-Ogahantō IC : Akita Sotokanjō Expressway
Shōwa-Ogahantō IC - Kotooka-Moritake IC : Nihonkai Tōhoku Engan Expressway
Kotooka-Moritake IC - Futatsui-Shirakami IC : Kotooka Noshiro Road

History
Planning for an expressway between the cities of Kitakami and Akita began in 1982. The first section of this expressway was opened on 25 July 1991 after nine years of planning and construction that cost 1.158 trillion yen (about 1 billion US dollars). It was a  section of highway that linked Akita to Yokote. By 1994 the expressway was linked to the Tōhoku Expressway in Kitakami following the opening of Kitakami Junction. The next major connection to the expressway was its linkage to the Nihonkai-Tōhoku Expressway at Kawabe Junction in Akita on 23 July 1997. 

An experiment was conducted by MLIT to determine what the effects of lifting tolls along the expressway north of the city of Akita would be. Immediately following the 2011 Tōhoku earthquake and tsunami, the experiment was suspended to raise funds for the repairs of expressways in the Tōhoku region. By August 2011 the expressway had been extended in various stages all the way north from the city of Akita to Futatsui-Shirakami Interchange in Noshiro. In August 2011, following the toll-lifting experiment it was decided by MLIT that much of the aforementioned segment of the expressway, as well as any future segments built along the planned route, would be toll-free. On 30 November 2013, the expressway was linked to its northern terminus in Kosaka along the Tōhoku Expressway following the opening of a  section of highway. On 13 December 2020, a  section of the expressway opened in Kitaakita, extending the northern section of the expressway closer to the southern section.

Future
As of December 2020, the entirety of the Akita Expressway is open to traffic except for a section linking the cities of Noshiro and Kitaakita in northern Akita Prefecture. A section of this gap in the route is set to be completed by 2023, however there is no date scheduled for the total completion of the expressway.

List of interchanges and features
 SA - service area, PA - parking area, TB - toll gate

See also

References

External links

 East Nippon Expressway Company

Expressways in Japan
Roads in Akita Prefecture
Roads in Iwate Prefecture
1991 establishments in Japan